Statehood Day or Admission Day is a legal holiday in the state of Hawaii in the United States. It is celebrated annually on the third Friday in August to commemorate the anniversary of the state's 1959 admission to the Union. It was first celebrated in 1969.

Statehood bills for Hawaii were introduced into the U.S. Congress as early as 1919 by Prince Jonah Kuhio Kalanianaole, the non-voting delegate sent by the Territory of Hawaii to the U.S. Congress.  Additional bills were introduced in 1935, 1947 and 1950. In 1959, the U.S. Congress approved the statehood bill, the Hawaii Admission Act. This was followed by a referendum in which Hawaiian residents voted 94% in support of statehood (the ballot question was: "Shall Hawaii immediately be admitted into the Union as a state?"), and on August 21, 1959 (the third Friday in August), President Dwight D. Eisenhower signed a proclamation making Hawaii the 50th state.

See also 
 List of U.S. states by date of admission to the Union

External links 
Hawaiian Holidays
Holidays to be Observed by the HAWAII STATE GOVERNMENT
Wording of a Hawaii Senate resolution to organize a celebration for Admission Day 2003.  Includes many details of the history of the admission of Hawai'i into the Union.

References

Celebrations in Hawaii
State holidays in the United States
1969 establishments in Hawaii
August observances
Holidays and observances by scheduling (nth weekday of the month)